Christian Kåsastul (born 9 April 1997) is a Norwegian professional ice hockeydefenseman who currently plays for the HIFK Hockey in the Liiga and the Norwegian national team.

Playing career
Kåsastul played as a youth in his homeland with Frisk Asker Ishockey of the then GET-ligaen. He has also played in the Swedish HockeyAllsvenskan with HC Vita Hästen and AIK IF.

Following the 2020–21 season with AIK IF, Kåsastul opted to pursue a career in North America, agreeing to a contract with the Greenville Swamp Rabbits of the ECHL on 23 August 2021.

Returning for a second season with the Swamp Rabbits, Kåsastul made 7 appearances to start the 2022-23 season, before opting to return to his original Norwegian club, Frisk Asker, on 22 November 2022. He made just 3 further appearances with Frisk before securing a contract with top flight Finnish club, HIFK of the Liiga, on 4 December 2022.

International play
He represented Norway at the 2019 IIHF World Championship.

Career statistics

Regular season and playoffs

References

External links

1997 births
Living people
AIK IF players
Frisk Asker Ishockey players
Greenville Swamp Rabbits players
HIFK (ice hockey) players
Norwegian expatriate ice hockey people
Norwegian expatriate sportspeople in Sweden
Norwegian ice hockey defencemen
Ontario Reign (AHL) players
Sportspeople from Skien
HC Vita Hästen players